Ryno may refer to:

People 

 "Ryno", nickname of Ryne Sandberg (born 1959), American baseball player, coach, and manager
 Artur Ryno, Russian criminal
 Johan Ryno (born 1986), Swedish ice hockey player
 Ryno Barnes (born 1981), South African rugby union footballer, who most recently played with the Free State Cheetahs
 Ryno Eksteen (born 1994), South African rugby union player for the Seattle Seawolves in Major League Rugby
 Ryno Liebenberg (born 1983), South African boxer
 Ryno Pieterse (born 1998), South African rugby union player for the Bulls in Super Rugby
 Tanya Ryno, American film and television producer, director, and writer

Other uses 
 Ryno (opera), an 1834 Swedish-language opera
 Ryno Township, in Nebraska, United States
 Ryno, South Africa, a place in the North West Province of South Africa

See also 
 Rhyno
 Rino (disambiguation)